The Northern Colorado Economic Development Corporation (NCEDC) served as a 501(c)(6) nonprofit corporation dedicated to attracting and supporting primary employers in Larimer County, Colorado. The not-for-profit corporation was dissolved in November of 2015. Over the course of its history, NCEDC was successful in attracting and serving a broad range of primary employers in Larimer County, Colorado.  A primary employer is a company which derives 50 percent or more of its revenue from products or services sold and consumed outside of the county.  .

The company's mission was to "advance economic vitality through strategic job growth,"   by attracting businesses that offer highly skilled positions  and creating a business environment conducive for innovation and entrepreneurism. This was accomplished by implementing an aggressive business prospect program, developing strong relationships with the existing Northern Colorado business community, and fostering the NCEDC brand.

History 

NCEDC was created in January 2001 ny the union of  the Fort Collins Economic Development Corporation and the Loveland Economic Development Council.

The Board of Directors has 23 members—13 of whom are voting, and 10 are ex officio. The voting members represent a variety of industries in Larimer and Weld Counties. The ex officio represent the communities of Larimer County and the county government itself.

On October 10, 2011, Walter J. Elish began his position as president and CEO of NCEDC.

The organization was dissolved in November, 2015.

Municipalities 

NCEDC served eight municipalities in Larimer County:.  Berthoud,   Estes Park,  Fort Collins, Johnstown.  Loveland,  Timnath.  Wellington, and Windsor

Partners 

NCEDC partnered with the local communities, Larimer County, the Colorado Office of Economic Development and International Trade, Upstate Colorado Economic Development, Colorado State University, Rocky Mountain Innosphere, the Colorado Association for Manufacturing and Technology, the local industry clusters, and the local real estate community.

References

External links 

Economy of Colorado
Economic development organizations in the United States